The 2009 Malaysian Open (also known as the 2009 Proton Malaysian Open for sponsorship reasons) was a men's tennis tournament played on indoor hard courts. It was the 1st edition of the Malaysian Open, and was classified as an ATP World Tour 250 series of the 2009 ATP World Tour. It was played at the Bukit Jalil Sports Complex in Kuala Lumpur, Malaysia. The inaugural edition was scheduled to take place from 26 September to 4 October 2009.

Entrants

Seeds

 Seeds are based on the rankings of 21 September 2009

Other entrants
The following players received wildcards into the singles main draw
  Joachim Johansson
  Taylor Dent
  Marcos Baghdatis

The following players received entry from the qualifying draw:
  Brendan Evans
  Mikhail Kukushkin
  Michael Yani
  Rohan Bopanna

Champions

Men's singles

 Nikolay Davydenko defeated  Fernando Verdasco, 6–4, 7–5.
 It was Davydenko's third title of the year and 17th of his career.

Men's doubles

 Mariusz Fyrstenberg /  Marcin Matkowski defeated  Igor Kunitsyn /  Jaroslav Levinský, 6–2, 6–1.

References

External links
 Official website

Malaysian Open